The origins of slavery in France can be traced back to the Merovingian dynasty in the 4th century. At least five Frankish queens during that period were former slaves: Ingund, Fredegund, Bilichild, Nanthild, and Balthild. Slavery continued under the Carolingian Empire.

Background 
In 1198, the Trinitarians were founded, with the purpose of redeeming war captives. This was one of the earliest steps towards eliminating slavery in France.

In 1315, Louis X published a decree abolishing slavery and proclaiming that "France signifies freedom", with the effect that any slave setting foot on French soil should be freed. However, limited cases of slavery continued until the 17th century in some of France's Mediterranean harbours in Provence, as well as until the 18th century in some of France's overseas territories. Most aspects of serfdom were also de facto abolished between 1315 and 1318. Louis X died two years after this event. In 1318, King Philip V abolished serfdom on his domain.

Society of the Friends of the Blacks 

The Society of the Friends of the Blacks was founded in Paris in 1788, and remained active until 1793, during the midst of the French Revolution. It was led by Jacques Pierre Brissot, who frequently received advice from British abolitionist Thomas Clarkson, who led the abolitionist movement in Great Britain. At the beginning of 1789, the Society had 141 members.

Period from 1794 to 1845
A series of events took place from 1791 which led to the abolition of institutionalized slavery in France, including the establishment of the national convention and the election of the first Assembly of the First Republic (1792–1804), on 4 February 1794, under the leadership of Maximilien Robespierre, culminating in the passing of the Law of 4 February 1794, which abolished slavery in all French colonies.

The Abbé Grégoire and the Society of the Friends of the Blacks were part of the abolitionist movement, which had laid important groundwork in building anti-slavery sentiment in Metropolitan France. The first article of the law stated that "slavery was abolished" in the French colonies, while the second article stated that "slave-owners would be indemnified" with financial compensation for the value of their slaves. The French constitution promulgated in 1795 declared in its Declaration of the Rights of Man that slavery was abolished.

 In 1802, Napoleon re-introduced slavery in sugarcane-growing colonies. In 1815, Napoleon abolished the slave trade.
 In 1815, the Congress of Vienna declared its opposition to the slave trade.
 In 1818, three years after the fall of Napoleon, Louis XVIII abolished the slave trade once again.
 On 18 and 19 July 1845, a set of laws known as the Mackau Law was passed, which paved the way towards the abolition of slavery in France.

Proclamation of the Abolition of Slavery in the French Colonies 

In particular Martinique was the first French overseas territory in which the decree for the abolition of slavery actually came into force, on 23 May 1848.

Gabon was founded as a settlement for emancipated slaves.

Slavery in France in the 21st century 
Since the abolition of slavery in 1848, additional efforts were made to eliminate other forms of slavery. In 1890, the Brussels Conference Act (a collection of anti-slavery measures aimed at ending the slave trade on land and sea, especially in the Congo Basin, the Ottoman Empire, and the East African coast) was signed, followed in 1904 by the International Agreement for the suppression of the White Slave Traffic. Only France, the Netherlands and Russia applied the treaty to the entirety of their colonial empires with immediate effect. In 1926, the Slavery Convention was ratified by France and other nations.

Although slavery has been outlawed for over a century, many criminal organizations still practice human trafficking. For this reason, on July 25, 2013, France recognized modern-day slavery as a crime punishable by up to 30 years in jail.

See also 
Slavery in France 
Slavery in the British and French Caribbean
Slavery in medieval Europe
Slavery in the United States
Slavery in Haiti
Affranchi
Race in France
Slavery museum (France)

References

1848 in France
1848 in law